Pedanandipadu mandal is one of the 57 mandals in Guntur district of the Indian state of Andhra Pradesh. It is under the administration of Guntur revenue division and the headquarters are located at Pedanandipadu.

Government

Administration 

The mandal is under the control of a tahsildar and the present tahsildar is G.V.Subba Reddy.

 census, the mandal has thirteen villages with one town.

The settlements in the mandal are listed below:

Note: †-Headquarters

See also 
 List of mandals in Andhra Pradesh
 Villages in Pedanandipadu mandal

References 

Mandals in Guntur district